Romano Tozzi Borsoi (born 16 February 1979) is an Italian footballer, who currently plays for ASD Ferentillo-Valnerina.

Career

ASD Ferentillo-Valnerina
In the summer 2019, Tozzi joined ASD Ferentillo-Valnerina. He also became a part of the club's technical staff, primarily as a technical director.

References

External links

Aic.football.it profile 

1979 births
Living people
Footballers from Rome
Italian footballers
Association football forwards
S.S.D. Sanremese Calcio players
Montevarchi Calcio Aquila 1902 players
Savona F.B.C. players
F.C. Pro Vercelli 1892 players
S.E.F. Torres 1903 players
Ternana Calcio players
A.C. Perugia Calcio players
A.S. Sambenedettese players
Civitanovese Calcio players
A.S.D. Città di Giulianova 1924 players
Serie C players
Serie D players